The College of Professional Studies (CPS) at the George Washington University, established in 2001, offers programs to professional students at the Bachelor's, Master's, and Graduate Certificate level. The Graduate School of Political Management is also housed in the college. The current interim dean is Chris Deering, PhD. CPS is one of the fourteen colleges and schools of the George Washington University.

The programs are housed in multiple buildings and centers in the Washington, DC and Virginia area. These facilities in Washington, DC include the Foggy Bottom campus of the George Washington University, space near Capitol Hill, and the Graduate Education Centers in Virginia in Ashburn, Alexandria, Arlington, and Newport News.

Programs
The College of Professional Studies offers 38 programs to Bachelors, Masters, and Graduate Certificate students.

Bachelor's programs
CPS offers the following Bachelor's programs:

Integrated Information, Science, & Technology Bachelors Completion
Police & Security Studies
Cybersecurity

Masters programs
CPS offers the following Masters programs:

Engineering Management
Human Resource Development (offered through Graduate School of Education and Human Development)
Landscape Design
Law Firm Management
Paralegal Studies
Public Leadership
Publishing
Homeland Security (formerly Security & Safety Leadership)
Cybersecurity Strategy and Information Management (formerly Strategic Cyber Operations & Information Management)
Sustainable Urban Planning
Systems Engineering

Graduate Certificate programs

CPS offers the following Graduate Certificate programs:

Climate Change Management & Policy
Healthcare Corporate Compliance
Justice & Public Safety Information Management
Landscape Design
Law Firm Management
Leadership Development
Organization Performance Improvement
Organizational Learning & Change
Paralegal Studies
Sustainable Landscapes
Urban Sustainability

Graduate School of Political Management
The Graduate School of Political Management offer Master's and Certificate programs in the following:

Advocacy in the Global Environment (Master)
Legislative Affairs (Master)
Political Communication and Governance (Master) (offered in Spanish)
Political Management (Master)
Strategic Public Relations (Master)
Campaign Strategy (Graduate Certificate)
Community Advocacy (Graduate Certificate)
Digital Politics (Graduate Certificate)
Global Public Relations (Graduate Certificate)
PACs & Political Management (Graduate Certificate)
Public Relations (Graduate Certificate)
Strategic Communications and Campaigns (Graduate Certificate) (offered in Spanish)
Strategic Governance and Political Management (Graduate Certificate) (offered in Spanish)

References

External links
 

Colleges and Schools of The George Washington University
Educational institutions established in 2001
2001 establishments in Washington, D.C.